Independent Conservatism (Conservatismo Independiente) is a conservative political party in Colombia. 
At the legislative election held on 10 March 2002, the party won parliamentary representation as one of the many small parties. In the election of 2006, the party won no seats.

External links
Official web site (Spanish).
Democracia a distancia: Elecciones 2006 (Portalcol.com) (Information about the party's list of candidates to the Colombian Senate, Spanish).

Conservative parties in Colombia